Edward Meller (c. 1647 – buried 1699), of Little Bredy, Dorset, was an English politician.

Family
He was the maternal grandson of MP, Owen Jennens.

Career
He was a Member (MP) of the Parliament of England for Dorchester in 1685.

References

1647 births
1699 deaths
English MPs 1685–1687
Members of the Parliament of England for Dorchester
Politicians from Dorset